Makutano Junction is a Kenyan soap opera that premiered in 2007. It captures different themes that affect the normal African society. The main contemporary issues that are mostly stressed in the drama are: corruption, education, early marriages and pregnancies, HIV/AIDS, human rights, social justice, values and perceptions, and conflict resolution. The story is set in a fictional village named Makutano and the ensemble cast is composed of different Kenyan actors.

Episodes

Season 1

Season 2

Season 3

Season 4

Season 5

Season 6

Season 7

Season 8

Season 9

Season 10

Season 11

Season 12

Season 13

References

External links

Lists of soap opera episodes
Lists of drama television series episodes
Lists of comedy-drama television series episodes